Caught in the Draft is a 1941 comedy/war film with Bob Hope directed by David Butler.

Plot
Famous Hollywood actor Don Bolton (Hope) is a vain movie star whose biggest fear is to be drafted into the US Army. He definitely lacks the qualities of a good soldier; he is so terrified of loud noise, he cannot cope with hearing a single 'gunshot' when he is on set shooting a war film. There is great doubt that he could last even a day in the service.

Colonel Peter Fairbanks (Clarence Kolb) visits the studio set as a consultant for the war film, and with him he has brought his beautiful daughter Antoinette, known as "Tony" (Dorothy Lamour). Don is smitten by Tony, and also realizes that his ticket out of the Army is to marry the colonel's daughter to avoid the draft.

Don manages to gravely insult the colonel when he mistakes him for an actor and treats him disrespectfully. Even so, Don manages to go on a date with Tony, and even proposes to her before hearing on the radio that the draft age eligibility ends at age 31.  As Don is 32 he retracts his proposal; Tony deduces his angle and is disgusted with him and cowardly behavior.

A few weeks later, Don realizes he truly is in love with Tony. He wants to impress her, so he decides to pretend to join the Army, using an actor as a fake enlistment officer. But at the draft centre the actor does not have the anticipated opportunity to replace the real officer, therefore Don, his assistant Bert (Eddie Bracken), and his manager Steve (Lynne Overman), all get enlisted for real. They are taken to a training camp, where Fairbanks is in charge. Fairbanks tells Don that if he can make it up to corporal rank, he gets to marry Tony. At first, this  proves to be more than Don and his unfortunate brothers in arms can handle. As punishment for their shortcomings, they are frequently on kitchen duty. Tony eventually falls in love with Don. When Don and his two companions are sent to a distant post  during a camp war game, Bert comes up with the idea to help their team by altering the signposts in the field. The result is disastrous, as the men on the opposing team are now following a route that will lead them into the artillery range, which is active. Don is forced to overcome his fear of noise (and death) to rescue Tony who, believing that Don is still too cowardly to go warn the men, sets out on horseback to do that herself. He accomplishes the rescue and continues, with Steve, through the artillery bombardment to warn the men. Don sustains an arm wound.

After their success, the three are promoted to the rank of corporal and Don is free to marry Tony.

Cast
 Bob Hope – Don Bolton
 Dorothy Lamour – Antoinette 'Tony' Fairbanks
 Lynne Overman – Steve Riggs
 Eddie Bracken – Bert Sparks
 Clarence Kolb – Col. Peter Fairbanks
 Paul Hurst – Sgt. Burns
 Ferike Boros – Yetta
 Phyllis Ruth – Margie
 Irving Bacon – Cogswell
 Arthur Loft – Movie director
 Edgar Dearing – Recruiting sergeant

Reception
The film was a big hit and became Paramount's second most successful release of 1941 after Louisiana Purchase.

References

External links
 

1941 films
American World War II films
American black-and-white films
Films scored by Victor Young
Films directed by David Butler
1940s war comedy films
Military humor in film
Paramount Pictures films
Films about the United States Army
American war comedy films
1941 comedy films
1940s American films